Allan Cations (10 October 1932 – 21 May 2015) was an Australian rules footballer who played for the Richmond Football Club in the Victorian Football League (VFL).

Notes

External links 

2015 deaths
1932 births
Australian rules footballers from Victoria (Australia)
Richmond Football Club players